Requiescant, also known as Kill and Pray, is a 1967 Spaghetti Western film directed by Carlo Lizzani.

Synopsis
After surviving his family being massacred, a young boy is taken in and raised by a priest. Years later he comes face to face with the man that killed his family and he is tempted back into violence.

Selected cast
 Lou Castel: Jeremy ("Requiescant")
 Mark Damon: George Bellow Ferguson
 Pier Paolo Pasolini: Don Juan
 Barbara Frey: Princy
 Rossana Martini (as Rossana Krisman): Lope
 Mirella Maravidi: Edith
 Franco Citti: Burt
 Ninetto Davoli (as Nino Davoli): El Nino
 Lorenza Guerrieri: Marta

Releases
Wild East Productions released a limited edition region 0 NTSC DVD on 1 November 2004, preserving the film's original widescreen aspect ratio. The DVD has the English title Kill and Pray on the box art but the title on the print used for the DVD transfer is the original Italian Requiescant title. The 2004 DVD is currently out of print, but the film was re-released under the title Kill and Pray in another limited edition R0 NTSC DVD in 2011 alongside Dead Men Don't Count, also starring Mark Damon.

References

External links

1967 films
1967 Western (genre) films
Spaghetti Western films
West German films
1960s Italian-language films
Films directed by Carlo Lizzani
Films scored by Riz Ortolani
1960s Italian films